Fleurette Campeau (10 January 1941 – September 2022) was a Canadian fencer. She competed in the women's team foil event at the 1976 Summer Olympics.

References

External links

1941 births
2022 deaths
Canadian female fencers
Olympic fencers of Canada
Fencers at the 1976 Summer Olympics
Fencers from Montreal
Commonwealth Games medallists in fencing
Commonwealth Games bronze medallists for Canada
French Quebecers
Fencers at the 1970 British Commonwealth Games
Medallists at the 1970 British Commonwealth Games